Lyudmila Mikhaylovskaya (born October 21, 1937) is a former Russian volleyball player for the USSR.

References 

Living people
1937 births
Sportspeople from Saint Petersburg
Soviet women's volleyball players
Olympic volleyball players of the Soviet Union
Volleyball players at the 1968 Summer Olympics
Medalists at the 1968 Summer Olympics
Olympic gold medalists for the Soviet Union
Honoured Masters of Sport of the USSR